Kożuchowski Młyn  is a settlement in the administrative district of Gmina Biała Piska, within Pisz County, Warmian-Masurian Voivodeship, in northern Poland.

From 1938-45 the settlement was called "Mühle Kölmerfelde"

References

Villages in Pisz County